Glen's Vodka is a brand of vodka, owned and produced by the Loch Lomond Group, a Scottish company. It is produced from sugar beet at the Catrine Distillery in Ayrshire, Scotland, and is sold by drinks retailers across the UK. It is available in 50 mL, 200 mL, 350 mL, 700 mL, and 1-litre bottles.

In July 2014, Glen's Vodka was reported to be the UK's second bestselling spirit.

History 

Glen's Vodka was launched in 1972. The brand was originally known as Grant's Vodka, but following a legal challenge   was relaunched in 2003 as Glen's Vodka.

In 2009, Glen's Vodka came first in a blind-tasting test conducted by British newspaper The Telegraph. The tasting included a variety of premium-brand vodkas including Grey Goose and Absolut.

In 2015, Glen's launched Platinum, a 40% ABV premium grain version of Glen's Vodka.

Counterfeiting 

Glen's Vodka has been among several vodka brands targeted by spirits counterfeiters.

In 2008, the UK’s Food Standards Agency publicised reports of counterfeit 700 mL bottles being sold.  Counterfeit bottles can be easily identified: unlike authentic Glen’s Vodka bottles, they do not feature the Allied Glass Containers (AGC) stamp on the bottom.

In 2011, UK authorities prosecuted a criminal gang responsible for counterfeiting Glen’s Vodka.  Enforcement officers seized 9,000 bottles of fake vodka from an illegal bottling plant in Leicestershire. Manufacturing equipment was also seized. Members of the gang received prison sentences of up to seven years.

See also 

 List of vodkas

References 

Alcoholic drink brands
British vodkas
Scottish brands